Tajalli Productions is an online digital infotainment channel, which produces short films, talk shows, interviews, social experiments, lectures on various social, political, and Islamic issues.

Web series
 Busting Myths about Muslims (2019)
 Desh Badal Raha Hai (2018)
 Lessons from Surah Yusuf (2018)
 Daily Quranic Summary (2017)
 Baat Mein Baat (2016–present)
 Glimpses from the Qur'an (2016)
 Manazir-e-Qurani (2016)

Short films

 Pani Pani Re
 Clean Eid-ul-Adha 
 Talaq - In the name of women's welfare.

References

YouTube channels